Earl of Mexborough, of Lifford in the County of Donegal, is a title in the Peerage of Ireland. It was created on 11 February 1766 for John Savile, 1st Baron Pollington, Member of Parliament for Hedon and New Shoreham. He had already been created Baron Pollington, of Longford in the County of Longford, on 8 November 1753, and was made Viscount Pollington, of Ferns in the County of Wexford, at the same time as he was given the earldom. These titles are also in the Peerage of Ireland. He was succeeded by his eldest son, the second Earl. He represented Lincoln in the House of Commons. His son, the third Earl, was Member of Parliament for Pontefract for many years. On his death the titles passed to his son, the fourth Earl. He represented Gatton and Pontefract in Parliament as a Conservative. His son, the fifth Earl, was High Sheriff of Yorkshire in 1877. He was succeeded by his half-brother, the sixth Earl.  the titles are held by the latter's grandson, the eighth Earl, who succeeded his father in 1980.

Despite their territorial designations and the fact that they are in the Peerage of Ireland, all three titles refer to places in England, namely Mexborough and Pollington in Yorkshire.

The current seat of the Earls of Mexborough is Arden Hall, near Hawnby, in Yorkshire. The estate was purchased by the family in 1897. Previously the family had lived at Methley Hall , which was demolished in 1958. John Horace Savile, 5th Earl of Mexborough, also built Castle Devachan in San Remo, the site of the 1920 San Remo conference. The former Bishop's House at Eltofts, Thorner, near Leeds, was the Dower House of the Earls of Mexborough.

Earls of Mexborough (1766)
John Savile, 1st Earl of Mexborough (1719–1778)
John Savile, 2nd Earl of Mexborough (1761–1830)
John Savile, 3rd Earl of Mexborough (1783–1860)
John Charles George Savile, 4th Earl of Mexborough (1810–1899)
John Horace Savile, 5th Earl of Mexborough (1843–1916)
John Henry Savile, 6th Earl of Mexborough (1868–1945)
John Raphael Wentworth Savile, 7th Earl of Mexborough (1906–1980)
John Christopher George Savile, 8th Earl of Mexborough (b. 1931)

Present peer
John Christopher George Savile, 8th Earl of Mexborough (born 16 May 1931) is the son of the 7th Earl and his wife Josephine Bertha Emily Fletcher. Styled formally as Viscount Pollington from 1945 on, he was educated at Eton College and Worcester College, Oxford, then was commissioned as a second lieutenant into the Grenadier Guards.

On 15 July 1980, he succeeded his father as Earl of Mexborough (1766), Viscount Pollington of Ferns (1766), Baron Pollington of Longford (1753), all in the peerage of Ireland, so did not gain a seat in the House of Lords.

On 30 May 1958, he married firstly Lady Elizabeth Harriot Grimston, daughter of John Grimston, 6th Earl of Verulam; they were divorced in 1972, after having two children:
John Andrew Bruce Savile, Viscount Pollington (born 1959), heir apparent, whose heir presumptive is his half-brother 
Lady Alethea Frances Clare Savile (1963–1994)

On 5 June 1972, he married secondly Catherine Joyce Hope, daughter of James Kenneth Hope and Mary Joyce Orlebar, and with her had two more children:
Lady Lucinda Sarah Catherine Savile (born 1973) 
James Hugh Hope John Savile (born 1976), who has a son, Arthur John Hope Thomas Savile (born 2011)

Ancestry

Notes

References
Kidd, Charles, Williamson, David (editors). Debrett's Peerage and Baronetage (1990 edition). New York: St Martin's Press, 1990,

External links
John Savile, 7th Earl of Mexborough at Geni.com
Josephine, Countess of Mexborough at Geni.com

Earldoms in the Peerage of Ireland
 
Noble titles created in 1766